Lactose permease is a membrane protein which is a member of the major facilitator superfamily.  Lactose permease can be classified as a symporter, which uses the proton gradient towards the cell to transport β-galactosides such as lactose in the same direction into the cell.

The protein has twelve transmembrane alpha-helices and its molecular weight is 45,000 Daltons. It exhibits an internal two-fold symmetry, relating the N-terminal six helices onto the C-terminal helices. It is encoded by the lacY gene in the lac operon.

The sugar lies in the hydrophilic core of the protein which is accessible from the periplasm. On binding, a large conformational change takes place which makes the sugar binding site accessible from the cytoplasm.

Mechanism: hydronium ions from the outside of the cell binds to a carboxyl group on the enzyme that allows it to undergo a conformational change. This form of lactose permease can bind lactose from outside the cell. The enzyme then everts and lactose is transported inward.

The X-ray crystal structure was first solved in 2003 by J. Abramson et al.

References 

Transport proteins
Transmembrane proteins